The   Mercedes-Benz Typ 230 n was introduced by Mercedes-Benz in 1937 as a successor to the  Typ 230 (W 21).    It was one of several models over the space of nearly eight decades to be sold with a name along the lines "Mercedes-Benz 230", and is therefore in retrospect more normally named according to its internal works designation as the Mercedes-Benz W 143.

Mercedes-Benz Typ 230 n (1937) 
The car was initially built with the same  wheelbase as the Typ 200 (W 21). It also inherited the sophisticated all-round independent suspension system originally introduced with the manufacturer's smaller Mercedes-Benz W15 model. There was no full width axle at the front, the wheels being suspended from two transverse leaf springs. At the back there were two half swing-axles.

The 6-cylinder 2,229 cc unit was the one that had first been seen a year earlier as part of the 1936 upgrade on the W 21 model, but now it was matched up to a more conventional four-speed manual transmission. The top ratio on the 2,229 cc version of the earlier model had been in effect an overdrive. Claimed top speed was 116 km/h (72 mph).

At launch the base chassis version of the car came with a recommended retail price of 4,200 Marks.   Customers wishing to buy a W 143 with one of the Mercedes standard bodies could choose between a two- or four-door “Limousine” (saloon/sedan) retailing respectively at 4,990 Marks or 5,270 Marks, or one of several cabriolet or roadster models, mostly with only two seats and costing more.   The grill was raked backwards and, on the standard car, had no bar for the mounting of lights, all of which helped to enhance the sleek appearance of the front.

The result of putting a  car body on the old  was one or two very long overhangs: in the case of the 1937 W143 the overhang was concentrated at the back. Whether because the excessive rear overhang looked rather odd, or for other reasons, the original W 143 failed to gain market acceptance, and although the short-wheelbase cars continued to be offered for sale until the end of 1937, well before that the model had effectively been relaunched with the longer  wheelbase that had already been offered on special long-wheelbase version of the Mercedes Typ 200 (W 21) for several years.

Mercedes-Benz Typ 230 (1937–1941) 
There was no longer a two-door “Limousine” (sedan/saloon) body offered, but the overall range of available bodies was actually greater than with the earlier version of the car, now including six-seater “Landaulet” and “Tourenwagen (Touring Car)” bodies as well as a four-door four-seater cabriolet (known as the “Cabriolet D”)  and a “Kraftdroschke” targeted at taxi operators.

The engine on the second 1937 version of the car was unchanged, as were the gear ratios.   However, the gearbox now incorporated synchromesh on all four forward ratios, whereas the earlier W143 had included synchromesh only for the two top ratios.

Diesel sibling 
The Mercedes-Benz 260 D, launched in 1936 as one of the world's first two diesel-engined passenger cars, also underwent a significant upgrade in 1937.   The new car shared the wheelbase and platform as well as most of the body options of the W143, but the diesel-powered car had a different works number.  It was known as the Mercedes-Benz W138.

Commercial 
The Mercedes-Benz 143 remained in production until 1941, although only 22 were produced in the final year.  

Between 1936 and 1941 Mercedes-Benz produced 20,336 of the cars, making it their second most popular model to date, albeit far behind their top seller of the time, the smaller W136.

The car's intended successor was presumably the Mercedes-Benz W153 which came with the same engine but a much more modern body.   That car's production run was truncated by the intervention of war, but after the war, in 1951, the manufacturer returned to the market for six-cylinder saloons and cabriolets with the Mercedes-Benz 220.

References 

This entry incorporates  information from the equivalent article in the German Wikipedia.

External links

W143
W143
Rear-wheel-drive vehicles
Sedans
1930s cars